A Ranger Cookie is an improvised confection created through the use of MRE condiments. The cookie is created by baking sugar and coffee creamer over a heat source. Depending on the MRE variant, other ingredients can be added to the cookie.

References 

Military food of the United States
Cookies